Fierce Angel is a UK-based record label set up in 2006 by DJ Mark Doyle.  The label employs a handful of DJs, sponsors special club night events, and employs a lifestyle marketing approach in regard to its endeavors.

History
Doyle (as well as several other employees and illustrator Jason Brooks) left the house music label Hed Kandi mid-2005 to start a new label - Tokyo Project. Their first CD, Tokyo Project: The Collection, was released in late 2005. However, fees resulting from a legal dispute with Hed Kandi forced Tokyo Project to close.

Doyle then set up the Fierce Angel label and released their first CD, Tokyo Disco, in early 2006. Subsequent releases have dropped the Tokyo reference altogether.

Fierce Angel have also begun to set up residencies with some nightclubs in the United Kingdom, as well as some summer presence in Ibiza.  Currently Fierce Angel hold events in over 20 clubs in the UK and 10 overseas including the United States, Amsterdam, Portugal, Colombia, Norway, Barcelona, Manila, Ibiza and many more.

Radio show
The Fierce Angel Radio Show is broadcast every week to over 25 countries around the world and is also broadcast on many stations in the UK. The show is presented by Mark Doyle and produced by Fierce Angel DJ George Elliott

Releases

Similar to Doyle's releases when with Hed Kandi, the CD compilations are mostly divided into genres with some crossover. All releases contain 3 discs except Fierce Disco V and VI, which contain 2 discs, and A Little Fierce, which contains 1 disc. Digital Angel 2006, Es Vive and A Little Fierce are mixed, while the other releases are unmixed.

Tokyo Disco/Fierce Disco
House, electronic and disco tracks. The first release inherited the Tokyo title from the defunct Tokyo Project as a way to "connect the dots" between the two companies.

 Tokyo Disco (2006) (FIANCD1)
 Fierce Disco (2007) (FIANCD6)
 Fierce Disco II (2008) (FIANCD10)
 Fierce Disco III (2009) (FIANCD14)
 Fierce Disco : Remixed (2009) (FIANCD15)
 Fierce Disco IV (2010) (FIANCOMP18)
 Fierce Disco V (2012)
 Fierce Disco VI (2013)

El Divino Ibiza
Single disc of mixed summer house tracks in line with Fierce Angel in El Divino Ibiza.

 El Divino Ibiza 2009 (2009) (FIANCDSAMP4)

Beach Angel
These tracks are often feelgood summery tracks, sometimes Latin-based.

 Beach Angel (2006) (FIANCD2)
 Beach Angel 2007 (2007) (FIANCD7)
 Beach Angel III (2008) (FIANCD12)
 Beach Angel IV (2010) (Digital Release)

Es Vive Ibiza
Tracks relevant to different times of day in the Ibiza hotel Es Vive: poolside, evening, afterhours. Each CD is similar to the Beach Angel, Fierce Disco and Fierce Angel albums respectively. These albums are mixed.

 Es Vive Ibiza 2006 (2006) (FIANCD3)
 Es Vive Ibiza 2007 (2007) (FIANCD8)
 Es Vive Ibiza 2008 (2008) (FIANCD13)
 Es Vive Ibiza 10th Anniversary Edition (2011)

Fierce Angel
The first disc is similar to Fierce Disco; disc 2 is similar to Twisted Disco from Hed Kandi, and disc 3 is a collection of house classics.

Fierce Angel (2006) (FIANCD4)
Fierce Angel : The Collection (2009) (FIANCOMP16)

Digital Angel
The 2006 edition was a download-only house mix available from iTunes, with most tracks already available on other compilations. The 2007 edition is a 3-disc unmixed compilation of sundrenched summer house.

Digital Angel (2006)
Digital Angel (2007) (FIANCD9)

Angels Fall
Chilled and acoustic music, similar to Winter Chill from Hed Kandi.

Angels Fall (2007) (FIANCD5)
Angels Fall II (2008) (FIANCD11)

A Little Fierce
A single disc sampler showcasing some of the tracks from other compilations.

 A Little Fierce (2007) (FIANCDSAMP1)
 A Little Fierce II (2008) (FIANCDSAMP2)
 A Little Fierce III (2009) (FIANCDSAMP3)
 A Little Fierce : Remixed (double-disc) (2010) (FIANCOMP17)

Singles / remix EPs
 Forgiveness by Wamdue Project (2009)
 A Little Sensitivity by Peyton (2010)
 Kingdom of Pretty by Bonnie Bailey (2010)
 Bonnie Bailey : The EP (2010)
 The Answer by Bassmonkeys (Vol.1) (2010)
 The Answer by Bassmonkeys (Vol.2) (2010)
 Love is the Music by FR feat. Jenny (2010)
 Fac15 : The EP (Vol.1) (2010)
 Electrojunkies - EP (Vol.1) (2010)
 Eric Kupper presents The EP (Vol.1) (2010)
 DJ by Ultravibe (2010)
 Haven't You Heard by Fac15 feat. Cathi O (2010)
 Purple Haze by Bassmonkeys (2010)
 Neon Lights by Electrojunkies feat. Therese (2010)
 Forgiveness by Wamdue Project feat. Jonathan Mendelsohn (Vol.1) (2010)
 Forgiveness by Wamdue Project feat. Jonathan Mendelsohn (Vol.2) (2010)
 Baker Street by The Fierce Collective ft. Peyton & Lady V(2010)
 Love U More by Oxford Hustlers and Katherine Ellis (2010)

See also
 List of record labels

External links
 Official site

House music record labels
Electronic dance music record labels
Electronica
British record labels
Record labels established in 2006